The 2012 United States House of Representatives elections in Georgia were held on Tuesday, November 6, 2012, and elected the 14 U.S. Representatives from the state, one from each of the state's 14 congressional districts, an increase of one seat following the 2010 United States Census. The elections coincided with the elections of other federal and state offices, including a quadrennial presidential election. The party primary elections were held on July 31, 2012, and the run-off on August 21, 2012.

The new congressional map, drawn and passed by the Republican-controlled Georgia General Assembly, was signed into law by Governor Nathan Deal on September 7, 2011. The new district, numbered the 9th, is based in Hall County.   The map also makes the 12th district, currently represented by Democrat John Barrow, much more favorable to Republicans.

Overview

By district
Results of the 2012 United States House of Representatives elections in Georgia by district:

District 1

Republican incumbent Jack Kingston, who has represented Georgia's 1st congressional district since 1993, is running for re-election.

Republican primary

Candidates

Nominee 
Jack Kingston, incumbent U.S. Representative

Primary results

Democratic primary

Candidates

Nominee 
 Lesli Rae Messinger, businesswoman,

Eliminated in primary
 Nathan Russo, retired businessman

Primary results

General election

Endorsements

Results

District 2

Democratic incumbent Sanford Bishop, who has represented Georgia's 2nd congressional district since 1993, is running for re-election. In redistricting, the 2nd district was made majority-African American and Macon was moved from the 8th district to the 2nd. The Hill ranked Bishop at fourth in its list of house members most helped by redistricting.

Democratic primary

Candidates

Nominee 
Sanford Bishop, incumbent U.S. Representative

Primary results

Republican primary

Candidates

Nominee 
 John House, Army veteran

Eliminated in primary
 Rick Allen, businessman and candidate for this seat in 2010 
 Ken DeLoach, pastor and Christian school dean and candidate for Georgia's 8th congressional district in 2010

Primary results

Runoff results

General election

Endorsements

Results

District 3

Republican incumbent Lynn Westmoreland, who has represented Georgia's 3rd congressional district since 2007, and had previously represented the 8th district from 2005 to 2007, is running for re-election.

Republican primary

Candidates

Nominee 
 Lynn Westmoreland, incumbent U.S. Representative

Eliminated in primary
 Chip Flanegan, business owner
 Kent Kingsley, former chair of the Lamar County Commission and retired Army lieutenant colonel

Primary results

General election

Endorsements

Results

District 4

Democratic incumbent Hank Johnson, who has represented Georgia's 4th congressional district since 2007, is running for re-election.

Democratic primary

Candidates

Nominee 
 Hank Johnson, incumbent U.S. Representative

Eliminated in primary
 Courtney Dillard, candidate for Rockdale County Board of Commissioners in 2010
 Lincoln Nunnally, business consultant,

Primary results

Republican primary

Candidates

Nominee 
 Chris Vaughn, pastor and motivational speaker

Eliminated in primary
 Greg Pallen, businessman

Primary results

Green primary

Candidates

Nominee 
 Cynthia McKinney, former U.S. Representative and Green Party Presidential nominee in 2008

General election

Endorsements

Results

District 5

Democratic incumbent John Lewis, who has represented Georgia's 5th congressional district since 1987, is running for re-election.

Democratic primary

Candidates

Nominee 
 John Lewis, incumbent U.S. Representative

Eliminated in primary
 Michael Johnson, former Fulton County superior court judge

Primary results

Republican primary

Candidates

Nominee 
 Howard Stopeck, retired attorney

Primary results

General election

Endorsements

Results

District 6

Republican incumbent Tom Price, who has represented Georgia's 6th congressional district since 2005, is running for re-election. In redistricting, the 6th district was made slightly less favorable to Republicans: Cherokee County was removed from the district, while parts of DeKalb County were added to it.

Democratic primary

Candidates

Nominee 
 Tom Price, incumbent U.S. Representative

Republican primary

Primary results

Democratic primary

Candidates

Nominee 
 Jeff Kazanow, business consultant

Eliminated in primary
 Robert Montigel, businessman

Primary results

General election

Endorsements

Results

District 7

Republican incumbent Rob Woodall, who has represented Georgia's 7th congressional district since January 2011, is running for re-election.

Republican primary

Candidates

Nominee 
 Rob Woodall, incumbent U.S. Representative

Eliminated in primary
 David Hancock, software company executive

Primary results

Democratic primary

Candidates

Nominee 
Steve Reilly, attorney

Primary results

General election

Endorsements

Results

District 8

Republican incumbent Austin Scott, who was first elected to represent Georgia's 8th congressional district in 2010, is running unopposed in the primary as well as the general election. In redistricting, most of Macon—the heart of the 8th and its predecessors for over a century—was shifted to the neighboring 2nd, thereby making the 8th district more favorable to Republicans, which prompted The Hill to rank Scott at fifth in its list of house members most helped by redistricting.

Republican primary

Candidates

Nominee
 Austin Scott, incumbent U.S. Representative

Primary results

Democratic primary

Candidates

Declined
Jim Marshall, former U.S. Representative
DuBose Porter, minority leader of the Georgia House of Representatives

General election

Endorsements

Results

District 9

In redistricting, the new 9th district is centered around Gainesville and has no incumbent.

Democratic primary
 Jody Cooley, attorney

Primary results

Republican primary

Candidates

Nominee 
 Doug Collins, state representative

Eliminated in primary
 Roger Fitzpatrick, school principal 
 Martha Zoller, radio personality

Declined
Hunter Bicknell, chair of the Jackson County Commission;
Jim Butterworth, State senator
Casey Cagle, Lieutenant governor
Bill Cowsert, state senator 
Clifton McDuffie, former chief executive officer of the Greater Hall Chamber of Commerce,

Endorsements

Primary results

Runoff results
Collins defeated Zoller in an August runoff election.

General election

Endorsements

Results

District 10

Republican incumbent Paul Broun, who has represented Georgia's 10th congressional district since 2007, ran for re-election.

Republican primary

Candidates

Nominee 
 Paul Broun, incumbent U.S. Representative

Eliminated in primary
 Stephen Simpson, businessman and retired Army officer

Declined
 Mac Collins, former U.S. Representative

Primary results

General election

Campaign
In a leaked video of a speech given at Liberty Baptist Church Sportsman's Banquet on September 27, Broun is heard telling supporters that, "All that stuff I was taught about evolution and embryology and the Big Bang Theory, all that is lies straight from the pit of Hell." Broun also believes that the world is less than 9000 years old and that it was created in six literal days. In response to this, and as Broun is also on the House Science Committee, libertarian radio talk show host Neal Boortz spearheaded a campaign to run deceased biologist Charles Darwin against Broun as the Democratic candidate, with the intention of drawing attention to these comments from the scientific community and having him removed from his post on the House Science Committee. Darwin received nearly 4,000 write-in votes in the election, which Broun won.

Endorsements

Results

District 11

Republican incumbent Phil Gingrey, who has represented Georgia's 11th congressional district since 2003, is running for re-election.

Republican primary

Candidates

Nominee 
 Phil Gingrey, incumbent U.S. Representative

Eliminated in primary
 William Llop, certified public accountant
 Michael Opitz, arbitrator

Primary results

Democratic primary

Candidates

Nominee 
 Patrick Thompson, technology sales executive and nominee for state senate's 56th district in 2010

Primary results

General election

Endorsements

Results

District 12

In redistricting, Savannah was removed from Georgia's 12th congressional district and replaced with the Augusta area, thereby making the district more favorable to Republicans. The former 12th district gave 55 per cent of its vote in the 2008 presidential election to Democratic nominee, whereas only 40 per cent of the new district's voters voted for Obama. Democratic incumbent John Barrow, who has represented the 12th district since 2005, is running for re-election.

Democratic primary

Candidates

Nominee 
John Barrow, incumbent U.S. Representative

Primary results

Republican primary

Candidates

Nominee 
 Lee Anderson, state representative

Eliminated in primary
 Rick W Allen, businessman 
 Wright McLeod, real estate lawyer and retired Navy commander 
 Maria Sheffield, attorney and candidate for State Insurance Commissioner in 2010

Declined
 Max Burns, former U.S. Representative
 Buddy Carter, state senator
 Ben Harbin, state representative
 Jeanne Seaver, Tea Party activist and candidate for this seat in 2010;
 Tommie Williams, state senate's president pro tempore

Endorsements

Primary results

Anderson defeated Allen in an August runoff election, winning the Republican nomination.

Runoff results

General election

Campaign
Given the increased Republican lean of his district and that his home in Savannah had been removed, Barrow faced significant political headwinds entering the general election campaign. However, his ad campaign, where he made direct-to-camera appeals was able to paint him a conservative democrat without alienating the party's liberal base. One ad featured Barrow showing off his grandfather's revolver and his father's bolt-action rifle and recounting "Long before I was born, my grandfather used this little Smith & Wesson here to help stop a lynching”.

In contrast, the Anderson campaign tried to appeal to the district's largely rural base by empathizing his background as a hay farmer. His cause wasn't helped by fact that Anderson, after stumbling in some of the GOP primary debates, has refused to share a debate stage with Barrow, a Harvard-educated lawyer.

Anderson's performance during the campaign was criticised by political analyst Stuart Rothenberg stating that "This district is one that should have never been a headache for the GOP, but after getting a weak nominee in state Rep. Lee Anderson, reality is setting in for many Republican operatives. Anderson's weakness isn't the only factor in this race. Rep. John Barrow has run a good race with terrific TV ads meant to demonstrate his political independence and get voters to focus on him and not on his party."

As election day approached, Barrow expressed confidence, saying that “I’m encouraged by everything I see and hear”.

Endorsements

Polling

Predictions

Results

District 13

Democratic incumbent David Scott, who has represented Georgia's 13th congressional district since 2003, is running for re-election.

Democratic primary

Candidates

Nominee 
 David Scott, incumbent U.S. Representative

Primary results

Republican primary

Candidates

Nominee 
Shahid Malik, businessman

Primary results

General election

Endorsements

Results

District 14

In redistricting, the new 14th district includes almost all of northwestern Georgia. Republican incumbent Tom Graves, who has represented the 9th district since May 2010, lives in this new district and is running for re-election here.

Republican primary

Candidates

Nominee 
 Tom Graves, incumbent U.S. Representative for Georgia's 9th congressional district

Declined
 Bob Barr, former U.S. Representative and Libertarian Party nominee in 2008
 Jerry Shearin, former chair of the Paulding County Commission
 Steve Tarvin, candidate for the 9th district in 2010

Primary results

Democratic primary

Candidates

Nominee 
 Danny Grant, electrician

Primary results

General election

Endorsements

Results

References

External links
Elections Division at the Georgia Secretary of State
Election results
United States House of Representatives elections in Georgia, 2012 at Ballotpedia
Georgia U.S. House at OurCampaigns.com
Campaign contributions for U.S. Congressional races in Georgia at OpenSecrets
Outside spending at the Sunlight Foundation

Georgia
2012
United States House of Representatives